Lionel Hutz is a fictional character in the American animated sitcom The Simpsons. He was voiced by Phil Hartman, and his first appearance was in the season two episode "Bart Gets Hit by a Car". Hutz is a stereotypical shady ambulance chasing lawyer in Springfield, with questionable competence and ethics. Nevertheless, he is often hired by the Simpsons. Following Hartman's death on May 28, 1998, Hutz was retired; his final speaking role was five months earlier, in the season nine episode "Realty Bites", and has since occasionally cameoed in the background.

Role in The Simpsons

Personality
Lionel Hutz is an ambulance chasing personal injury lawyer and, according to Lisa Simpson, a "shyster" whom the Simpsons nonetheless repeatedly hire as their lawyer (a fact remarked on by Marge Simpson in a typically self-aware aside), mostly because Hutz is the only legal counsel the Simpsons can afford.  His legal practice, located in a shopping mall, is named "I Can't Believe It's A Law Firm!" and also offers "expert shoe repair." He often tries to entice potential clients with free gifts, including a "smoking monkey" doll, a pen that looks like a cigar, an exotic faux-pearl necklace, a business card that "turns into a sponge when you put it in water," and even an almost-full Orange Julius he was drinking from himself. John G. Browning of the Southeast Texas Record describes Hutz as a literal ambulance chaser; "Hutz typifies the sleazy lawyer. He exaggerates his academic credentials ("I've attended Harvard, Yale, MIT, Oxford, the Sorbonne, the Louvre") and is "the very worst in legal marketing".

Hutz is characterized as both a grossly incompetent lawyer and an unethical individual in general. This, along with his greed in wanting half of the money, was supported in "Bart Gets Hit by a Car" in his first appearance. Hutz is disliked and mistrusted by both Marge and Lisa who see him for the person he is—especially when he, along with Homer, made Bart lie about the extent of his injuries. Marge later testified against Hutz out of spite for hiring Dr. Nick, a quack doctor with a shady reputation, along with making Bart lie about his injuries and being in intense pain when in fact he was fine. Hutz's incompetence and greed are also noted by his rival, the more competent Blue Haired Lawyer. In the episode "Marge in Chains" Hutz describes the following as his "problem" with Judge Snyder: Well, he's had it in for me ever since I kinda ran over his dog. Well, replace the word "kinda" with the word "repeatedly" and the word "dog" with "son".

Hutz is a recovering alcoholic. He once offered Marge a celebratory "belt of Scotch" at 9:30 in the morning, remarking that he had not slept in days. In the same episode, he hastily leaves the courtroom after handling a bottle of bourbon in order to consult his sponsor, David Crosby. He then gives his closing statement, unaware that he is not wearing any pants and thinks that Clarence Darrow was "the black guy on The Mod Squad". Beyond practicing law, he also tries his hand at selling real estate, reasoning that it was a natural move as most of his clients ended up losing their homes anyway. Out of desperation for work, he has resorted to babysitting. Hutz, left in charge of the children for longer than he was hired, nods off in a sitting position; he produces a switchblade upon awakening suddenly. He burns all of his personal documentation in the Simpsons fireplace, claiming that "Lionel Hutz" no longer exists and he is now "Miguel Sanchez". His other alias is "Dr. Nguyen Van Phuoc". He also ran a shoe-repair business out of his law office. Hutz's incompetence and financial desperation sometimes lead him to resort to rooting through dumpsters, claiming it is client-related. Hutz was briefly married to Selma Bouvier, although this storyline is not shown in an episode and instead mentioned in "Selma's Choice". However, he only married Selma in order to get his hands on her Aunt Gladys' inheritance. When he was caught forging Gladys' signature by Marge and Lisa, Hutz was forced to properly read the will and give Marge's family Gladys' inheritance. Hutz has also been known to use a phone booth as an office.

Hutz does not seem to care about conflict of interest; in "A Streetcar Named Marge" he represents clients in a lawsuit against the producers of a local production of A Streetcar Named Desire for not giving them any roles in the play, although he had a role himself.

Another display of his incompetence takes place in "The Boy Who Knew Too Much" when, while representing a French waiter who is accusing Mayor Quimby's nephew Freddy of battery, he is surprised when the opposing counsel mentions that Hutz's client is an immigrant (despite the client's French accent). Hutz then demands that his client tell him everything from then on. Browning wrote that his "courtroom skills leave something to be desired"; in the episode "Marge in Chains", he motions for a "bad court thingy", at which the judge replies "You mean a mistrial?", and then refers to himself as the "law-talking guy".

Cases won
Although Hutz loses most of his cases, he does win several cases for the Simpsons. In "Bart the Murderer", he represented Bart when the latter was suspected for the supposed murder of Seymour Skinner, and the charges were dropped when Skinner reveals himself to be alive. In "New Kid on the Block", he represents Homer in his case against the Sea Captain and the Frying Dutchman restaurant over its "All You Can Eat" offer ("The most blatant case of fraudulent advertising since my suit against the film The NeverEnding Story"). He also wins a case for Bart in "The Day the Violence Died", by proving that Itchy was created by an old man named Chester J. Lampwick—though the deciding factor of the case is mainly proven by Bart's footwork to collect the crucial piece of evidence, rather than Hutz's competence.  Hutz initiates the trial with zero credible evidence. In "'Round Springfield", Hutz successfully sues Krusty the Clown after Bart consumes a jagged metal Krusty-O from a box of cereal, resulting in an inflamed appendix. After winning the case, Hutz gives Bart only $500 of the $100,000 settlement. In "Sideshow Bob Roberts", Hutz wins a case against Sideshow Bob, who was mayor at that time, for electoral fraud, in which Bart and Lisa found evidence connected to it.

The only other case technically won by Hutz was in "Treehouse of Horror IV", where he represents Homer against Satan (who, in a twist, is revealed to resemble Ned Flanders). In a purportedly-deleted scene for this episode, as subsequently seen in "The Simpsons 138th Episode Spectacular", Hutz's slogan is "Cases won in 30 minutes or your pizza is free". After he thinks he has lost the case, he gives the Simpsons their pizza. However, Marge informs him that they did win. Then, he tells them that the box was empty anyway. In the video game The Simpsons: Hit & Run, billboards can be seen around Downtown Springfield promoting Hutz's free pizza offer.

Creation and retirement
Phil Hartman was first suggested for the role of Lionel Hutz by Simpsons writer Jay Kogen, who liked Hartman's "great, strong voice." Writer Mike Scully described Hutz as a "combination of overconfidence and incompetence. He never doubted his ability in the courtroom for some reason, even though he had no idea what was going on."

After Hartman's death in 1998, Hutz was going to be recast with Harry Shearer, but the character was retired along with Troy McClure, Hartman's other recurring character. The last episode to feature Hutz speaking was the season 9 episode "Realty Bites". Since the Simpson family frequently appears in court, other characters have represented the Simpsons in legal matters since Hutz's retirement. For example, in "Sweets and Sour Marge", the equally-incompetent Gil Gunderson stepped in. The Blue Haired Lawyer—who is just as unethical yet very competent – has also served as the family's attorney. Following Hartman's death, Hutz appeared infrequently in clip shows and flashbacks, as well as crowd scenes, but only in non-speaking roles. His last appearance in the series was in the season 12 episode "A Tale of Two Springfields". Hutz and McClure still appeared in Simpsons Comics until its end in 2018.

Reception
Entertainment Weekly named Hutz as one of their 15 favorite fictional television and film lawyers. His characterization as an ambulance chaser who is only concerned with money has been viewed as part of a trend away from more noble depictions of lawyers in literature, such as Atticus Finch, and towards more critical depictions of lawyers and the United States legal system.  Hutz has also been examined as an example of a fictional depiction of a member of the professional service market  in popular culture.

References

External links

 Lionel Hutz on IMDb

The Simpsons characters
Television characters introduced in 1991
Animated characters introduced in 1991
Fictional American lawyers
Fictional real estate brokers
Fictional con artists
Fictional alcohol abusers
Fictional Republicans (United States)
Male characters in animated series
Animated human characters

pl:Postacie w serialu Simpsonowie#Lionel Hutz